Vrdnik is a village located in the municipality of Irig, northern Serbia, in the Vojvodina province of Serbia. It is located at southern slopes of Fruška Gora, at the border of the national park. As of 2011 census, it has a population of 3,092 inhabitants.

Name
In Serbian the village is known as Vrdnik (Врдник)and in Hungarian as Rednek.

Features

Although small, the village has several distinctive features: a thermal spa, Vrdnik-Ravanica monastery from the 16th century, former coal mine with steam power plant built in 1911,
 but destroyed during NATO bombing of Yugoslavia in 1999, and a ruined castle, known as Castellum Rednek or Vrdnička kula (Tower of Vrdnik).

Geography
Vrdnik is placed near the heart of Fruška Gora, in a valley surrounded by its slopes, at elevation of 181–260 m and coordinates . The valley is formed by three creeks named Dubočaš, Morintov potok and Veliki potok. Most houses are built in lines (colonies) along steep streets leading uphill from the town center.

History
9th century BC graves of Bosut culture were found in Vrdnik.

Tower of Vrdnik is significant historical monument, whose basements date from the Roman period. The tower's builder supposedly was Roman emperor Probus in 287 During the reign of the Kingdom of Hungary, a new fortress was built in the 14th century on its remains, of which only the today's tower remained. The Castellum Redneck, as it was called, was probably used for protection of Vrdnik and partly Sirmium (Sremska Mitrovica).

This first written data about Vrdnik fortress date from 1315, but they consistently reappeared only after 1702  The village developed along the nearby monastery, and the population consisted of emigrants from all sides who worked as serfs at the monastery's property. They lived at the settlement called Prnjavor which was separate from the Village.

The key year for the development of Vrdnik was 1804, when a brown coal mine was opened following the discovery of large deposits. For almost a century and a half, it was the key feature of the village's development. Miners from entire Habsburg monarchy settled in the town, forming new parts of the settlement, first of which is now known as the Old Colony (Stara Kolonija). Lipovac developed next, along the road to village and monastery Jazak. The smallest part is New Colony, raised between 1890 and 1908 and lies at the western part of the town. The part named "Clerk's line" (Činovnički red) was apparently housed by clerks from the mine and administration.

The mine was closed in 1968 because deposits were largely exhausted, and coal exploitation became unviable. The village's population is in a decay since.

Recent developments
The traces of mine exploitation are still present all over the village, like entries to the shafts (Barbara, Gustav, Južno pomoćno, Zora, Glavno) and a number of buildings. The "Miners' house" is scheduled for transformation into an ethno-tourist attraction.

After the mine's closure, most of the population turned back to agriculture. For its favorable geographic position, the area of Vrdnik is suitable for winemaking.

The spa, accompanied with hotel with annex, bungalows, 260 beds total, and two Olympic-size swimming pools presents an important touristic asset and a source of income. The water temperature is 32.8 °C, and the spa is suitable for treatment of rheumatoid ailments, postoperative conditions, various painful disorders, and general balneologic recuperation.

Demographics

As of 2011 census, the village of Vrdnik has a population of 3,092 inhabitants.

Notable people
 Aleksandar Berček, actor
 Franjo Ožegović, Yugoslav geologist
 Milan Stepanović, poet
 Milica Stojadinović-Srpkinja, poet
 Zvonko Turkali, architect

See also 
 List of spa towns in Serbia
 List of places in Serbia
 List of cities, towns and villages in Vojvodina

References

Literature
 Slobodan Ćurčić, Broj stanovnika Vojvodine, Novi Sad, 1996.

External links 

 Vrdnik – naselje, tvrđava, rudnik, banja, manastir 
 Vrdnik spa

Populated places in Syrmia
Spa towns in Serbia